Albion Online (AO) is a free medieval fantasy MMORPG developed by Sandbox Interactive, a studio based in Berlin, Germany. 

Set in a medieval world, Albion Online is a medieval fantasy game based on the Arthurian legends, with militaristic strategy aspects to it. Albion Online has been translated into 11 languages and has over 5 million registered users.

Gameplay

Albion Online's gameplay centres itself around a classless system, in which the equipment a player chooses to wear defines their abilities and the way they can play. Players can go out and do activities in Albion's world in order to gain "Fame" (Similar to Experience of other similar MMORPG's) Through this Fame players can get access to other weapon and armour types, with stronger equipment requiring more Fame to use. Stronger gear can be used as you progress throughout the game.
The game has a large open-world map that players can travel through. Different PVP zones offer different levels of risk and reward, including Yellow, Red, and Black zones; Red and Black zones featuring full loot drop upon death. 

The game has a fully player driven economy. All equipment and items are made by other players. The game offers both PVE and PVP experience.

Development

During the beta stages of development, players were able to purchase "Founder's Packs" to gain access to the closed beta play-tests which were run intermittently by Sandbox Interactive, typically after an interval of a few months of development. After the release of the game, these founder's packs were made unavailable for purchase. Albion Online removed its free-to-play model for various reasons on December 30, 2015. (Which was then made free again at a later date) 

When it initially released on July 17, 2017, Albion Online offered a selection of "Starter Packs" which granted players access to the game and offered a varying amount of gold(In-game currency) to get started. Once a player purchased any of the starter packs, they would be granted open-ended access to the game with no extra mandatory fees. Players could also purchase membership for a limited amount of time without the benefits of the starter packs. On April 10, 2019, Albion Online went Free to Play. Players can also buy premium with in-game currency (gold & silver).

References

External links
 
 Official wiki

2017 video games
Active massively multiplayer online games
Android (operating system) games
Fantasy massively multiplayer online role-playing games
IOS games
Linux games
MacOS games
Massively multiplayer online role-playing games
Video games developed in Germany
Windows games